Maria Cuomo (born 9 May 1946), best known as Nancy Cuomo, is an Italian singer and producer.

Life and career 
Born in Piedimonte d'Alife (now called Piedimonte Matese), in the Province of Caserta, Campania, Cuomo started performing in a beat band, mainly active in local festivals and in music halls of Caserta. After recording her first singles with the label  KappaO, in the mid-1960s she moved to Rome, where she was scriptured by the club Kilt.

Noted by Nico Fidenco, Cuomo was offered to perform "Love Love Bang Bang", theme song of the film Kiss Kiss...Bang Bang. In 1968 she was put under contract by Fonit Cetra. During her career Cuomo took part to Cantagiro, to some episodes of Settevoci and to several high-profile television programs. In 1973 she married and significantly slowed her activities.

Discography

Album   
     1965: Il Juke Box (KappaO, LP - ES-20056-71)
     1966: Sanremo '66 (KappaO, LP - cod. MOE-2)
     1967: Stereo Cinema Parade (Parade, LP - FPRS-311)
     1968: Cantagiro '68 (CGD, LP - 25811)
     1974: Viaggio nell'amore (Erre, LP - RRL-2014)
     1975: L'amore è una cosa meravigliosa (Erre, LP - BSL-2014)
     1980: Prendimi, tienimi (Hilton Record, LP - HJK-0155))
     1996: E nisciuno vo' sentì (Nancy Cuomo Music, CD/MC - NC001)
     1999: Parlami ancora (Nancy Cuomo Music, CD - CG20376) 
     2000: Canti del cielo (Nancy Cuomo Music, CD - RF16942)
     2005: Cine Jazz (GDM Music, CD - GDM2055)
     2006: The Spy Movie Collection (Verita Note - Japan, CD - CPC81090)
     2007: Movie Songs Book (Gemelli, CD - GG2505)
     2009: Aria di Roma (La Semicroma Label, CD - FC170410)

References

External links
 MySpace

 

 

1949 births
Living people
People from the Province of Caserta
Italian women singers
Italian pop singers 
Italian women composers